Clint Lee Harris, known as Bo Harris (born January 16, 1953), is a former American football linebacker who played eight seasons in the National Football League (NFL) with the Cincinnati Bengals. Harris played college football at Louisiana State University.

References

1953 births
Living people
American football linebackers
Cincinnati Bengals players
LSU Tigers football players
People from Leesville, Louisiana
Players of American football from Shreveport, Louisiana